Wrench in the Works was an American Christian mathcore/metalcore band originating from Hartford, Connecticut.  In addition to recording music and touring, Wrench in the Works had been featured on TVU and TVU's metalcore show, Battery for the video to their hit song, "Dust Over Time Test." On September 28, 2010, Facedown Records announced that Wrench in the Works had disbanded.

Prodigal Transmission 

In 2005, while under the label Redscroll Records, Wrench in the Works released their debut album, Prodigal Transmission.

Lost Art of Heaping Coal 
By 2008, Wrench in the Works had left Redscroll Records and signed onto Facedown Records where they released their second album, Lost Art of Heaping Coal.

Band members 
Final Lineup
Darrell Tauro - lead vocals
Greg Thomas - guitar
Derek Anderson - bass
Andy Nelson - drums

Former
Dan Sherman - guitar
Justin Mehl - guitar, backing vocals

Discography 
Studio albums

References

External links 
Official Myspace
Jesus Freak Hideout

American Christian metal musical groups
Musical groups established in 1999
Musical groups disestablished in 2010
Facedown Records artists
1999 establishments in Connecticut